Oikonomou, also transliterated as Ikonomou and Economou, is a Greek surname, deriving from the word oikonomos, "housekeeper, steward". It can refer to:

Aikaterini Oikonomou, birth name of Ketty Diridaoua, Greek actress
Antonis Oikonomou (1785-1821), naval captain in the Greek War of Independence
Constantin von Economo (1876-1931), Austrian neurologist
Demetris Economou (born 1992), Cypriot association football player
Dimitrios Oikonomou (1883-1957), Greek admiral
Eleftherios N. Economou (born 1940), Greek Professor of Physics 
Eleftherios Oikonomou (born 1956), Greek Chief of Police
Evangelos Ikonomou (born 1987), Greek association football player
George Economou (poet) (1934-2019), American poet
George Economou (Shipbuilder) (born 1953), Greek billionaire shipowner
George A. Economou, Sr. (1923-2003), optical systems expert
James S. Economou (born 1951), surgical oncologist, tumor immunologist, and Vice Chancellor for Research at the UCLA
Manthos Oikonomou (1754-1820), Greek scholar and Ali Pasha's advisor
Marios Oikonomou (born 1992), Greek football player
Michalis Oikonomou (1888-1933), Greek impressionist painter
Nicolas Economou (1953-1993), Cypriot composer
Nick Economou, Australian political scientist
Nikos Ekonomou (born 1973), Greek basketball player
Panajotis Iconomou (born 1971), Greek-German baritone
Pavlos Oikonomou-Gouras (1897-1991), Greek diplomat
Thanasis Oikonomou (born 1978), Greek swimmer
Thomas Oikonomou (1864-1927), Greek actor

Greek-language surnames
Occupational surnames